Umaria is a municipality city in the Umaria district of the Shahdol Division of Madhya Pradesh, India.

Geography 

Climate

Demographics

According to the latest 2011 census, Umaria has a population of 33,114 divided in 15 wards. Male population is 17,509 and that of female is 15,605. Umaria has an average literacy rate of 84.70 percent, higher than state average of 69.32 percent, male literacy is 91.10 percent, and female literacy is 77.49 percent. In Umaria, 12.34 percent of the population is under 6 years of age. Out of the total population, 10,511 out of which 8,758 are males, engaged in work or business activity.

Scheduled Castes and Scheduled Tribes constitutes 12.82 percent and 18.57 percent of the total population in Umaria.

References